Fabiana Lovece (born 17 July 1972) is an Argentine biathlete. She competed in the women's sprint event at the 1992 Winter Olympics.

References

External links
 

1972 births
Living people
Biathletes at the 1992 Winter Olympics
Argentine female biathletes
Olympic biathletes of Argentina
Place of birth missing (living people)